Gajah Mada inscription also known as Singhasari inscription, is an inscription written in old Javanese script, dated to 1273 Saka or corresponds to 1351 CE from Majapahit period, discovered in Singosari district, Malang Regency, East Java. The inscription is now preserved in National Museum of Indonesia in Jakarta under inventory number D 111. The inscription was carved on a smooth surface, and the letters are clearly legible.  

This inscription mentions Mpu Mada, the famed mahapatih (prime minister) of the 14th century Majapahit kingdom. Historians suggests the mahapatih himself commissioned this inscription — a political authority typically reserved only for the monarch (kings and queens). This indicates the importance of Gajah Mada's position within the kingdom that even has the right to issue his own inscription. Therefore, this inscription is called the Gajah Mada inscription.

Content
This inscription was written to commemorate the construction of a funerary caitya or burial temple dedicated to King Kertanegara of Singhasari that died in 1214 Saka or 1292 CE, carried out by Mahapatih Gajah Mada. The first half of this inscription described a very detailed date, including the astronomical position of the celestial bodies. The second half suggests the purpose of this inscription, which is as a construction of a caitya. The temple mentioned in this inscription most possibly refer to the syncretic Shivaist-Buddhist Singhasari temple, since this inscription was discovered near this temple.

Transcription

References

Inscriptions in Indonesia
14th-century inscriptions
Majapahit